Peshcherovsky is a rural locality (a khutor) in Verkhnesolonovskoye Rural Settlement, Surovikinsky District, Volgograd Oblast, Russia. The population was 148 as of 2010.

Geography 
Peshcherovsky is located on the right bank of the Solonaya River, 36 km south of Surovikino (the district's administrative centre) by road. Verkhnesolonovsky is the nearest rural locality.

References 

Rural localities in Surovikinsky District